East Potomac Park is a park located on a man-made island in the Potomac River in Washington, D.C., United States. The island is between the Washington Channel and the Potomac River, and on it the park lies southeast of the Jefferson Memorial and the 14th Street Bridge. Amenities in East Potomac Park include the East Potomac Park Golf Course, a miniature golf course, a public swimming pool (the East Potomac Park Aquatic Center), tennis courts, and several athletic fields (some configured for baseball and softball, others for soccer, rugby, or football). The park is a popular spot for fishing, and cyclists, walkers, inline skaters, and runners heavily use the park's roads and paths. A portion of Ohio Drive SW runs along the perimeter of the park.

East Potomac Park is accessible primarily by road via Ohio Drive SW. The DC Circulator National Mall Route, which began service in June 2015, provides the best public transportation option for reaching East Potomac Park. The closest Circulator stop is at East Basin Drive SW south of the Jefferson Memorial, which is within easy walking distance of Ohio Drive SW and the north end of the park. Metrobus does not serve the park, and there is no Washington Metro stop close to the park. The nearest Metro stop is the Smithsonian station at Independence Avenue SW and 12th Street SW, about six blocks away. (Walking from Metro requires accessing the park via Raoul Wallenberg Place SW, Maine Avenue SW, and Ohio Drive SW.)

Construction

Although the shoreline of the Potomac River in the District of Columbia was likely to have been littered with shoals, sandbars, and marsh flats, no documentation of these was undertaken until 1834. At that time, the United States Army Corps of Topographical Engineers identified extensive tidal flats below Long Bridge (the predecessor structure to the 14th Street Bridge). By 1881, these extended from about the Old Naval Observatory down to Buzzard Point. Near the modern intersection of 17th Street NW and Constitution Avenue NW, the city's sewer system discharged into an extensive tidal flat, known as Kidwell's Meadows. Exposed to the air about half the time, the sewage began decomposing, creating a powerful, rank smell.

The southern part of the Pennsylvania Avenue district was flooded many times in the last three decades of the 19th century. Major floods occurred in October 1870 (during which Chain Bridge was destroyed), February 1881, November 1887, and June 1889 (the same storm which caused the Johnstown Flood). Floodwaters were high enough that rowboats were used on the avenue, and horse-drawn streetcars saw water reach the bottom of the trams. Much of the dredged material was used to build up the existing tidal flats in the Potomac River as well as sandbars which had been created by silting around Long Bridge. Reclamation occurred in three phases:  Section 1 (became  West Potomac Park), section 2 (became the  the area around the Tidal Basin), and section 3 (became the  East Potomac Park). Congress formally designated these areas "Potomac Park" on March 3, 1897.

To ensure that the island was not eroded by the river, poplars and willows were planted along edge of the island to stabilize the shoreline. Over the next two decades, most of East Potomac Park lay untouched, and dense thickets of trees and brush grew up on the island. Dredging of the Potomac River continued even after East Potomac Park was considered finished, and additional dredged material was placed on the island in late 1900, 1901, 1902, 1903, 1904, and 1907.

Beginning in late 1907, a bridge was built across the Tidal Basin Outlet Channel, carrying the Washington, Alexandria, and Mount Vernon Electric Railway (a streetcar line) over the Washington Channel and the Long Bridge into Virginia. This was completed in June 1908. More dredge material was deposited on the island in 1909, 1911, and 1912.

In 1900, the United States Senate established the Senate Park Commission to reconcile competing visions for the development of Washington, D.C., and the parks within it.  Better known as the McMillan Commission, because of its influential chairman, Senator James McMillan, the commission released a document known as McMillan Plan in 1902. The McMillan Plan called for turning the undeveloped land into a formal park with extensive recreation facilities.

History of the park
Infilling of the East Potomac Park island continued long after the island was considered complete. In 1906, a large elliptical depression covering about  existed in the center of the island. Due to the distance to shore, the Corps of Engineers felt it was not feasible to fill in the area. But a contractor, eager to be rid of dredged material, filled it in for free in 1908. A portion of the park then served in 1910 as a nursery for providing trees, shrubs, and flowers for Congress, the White House, and other governmental agencies.

Congress gave permission for the Corps to open East Potomac Park to the public in August 1912. In September 1912, the Corps began construction of a  road on the Potomac River shoreline of East Potomac Park. Work continued on the Potomac River shoreline in 1914, and continued up the Washington Channel side. The road on the Channel side was completed in spring 1915, leaving a temporary road around the southern tip of the island. This portion of the road was finished in late June 1915.

Congress transferred jurisdiction of East Potomac Park to the District of Columbia from the federal government in legislation enacted on August 1, 1914. At the time, public works in the District of Columbia were overseen by the Army Corps of Engineers, so this legislation effectively placed the park under the Corps' jurisdiction.

Spring 1915 saw the Corps extensively landscape East Potomac Park for the first time, planting 46,650 shrubs and flowering plants and 203 Japanese cherry trees (or sakura) along the roadway. Another 133 Japanese cherry trees were planted in spring 1916.

One of the first structures added to East Potomac Park was the National Park Service (NPS) lodge. The Corps of Engineers had originally proposed constructing a small lodge in East Potomac Park in 1908 to serve as a tool shed and public toilet and to serve as a shelter for police patrolling the park. But Congress did not approve this plan. Instead, a lodge originally built in Franklin Square in downtown Washington, D.C., about 1867 was moved to the north end of East Potomac Park, near the Washington Channel shoreline, between 1913 and June 1915. The National Park Service used the structure for various purposes until 1965, when Congress established the National Mall and Memorial Parks (known as NAMA, for National Mall) administrative unit of the National Park Service's National Capital Parks. NAMA has used the lodge for its headquarters ever since.

Bridle paths for horseback riding were also constructed in the park in 1913, and significantly expanded in summer 1915 and spring 1916. The first three of the park's many baseball diamonds were established in early 1915, and extensive cinder-lined walking paths constructed in summer 1915 and spring 1916. The Corps proceeded to clear grade, plow, and seed  of land in the center of the park for use as athletic fields in the summer of 1916 and again in the spring of 1917. But this land was turned over to the Boy Scouts of America for use as a victory garden.

Golf course and fieldhouses

Much of the park remained undeveloped until 1913, when a "fieldhouse" with lockers and showers was proposed by the United States Army Corps of Engineers for construction toward the center of the park. No funding for the fieldhouse was provided, but the following year the Corps of Engineers, acting on a request from local sportsmen, won approval for construction of a golf course on the lower two-thirds of the park. Work on the course was delayed for a variety of reasons, but construction finally began in January 1917, when golf course architect Walter Travis visited the city to see the site and begin designing the course. Although funding for construction was approved in May 1918, work was delayed during World War I as temporary soldiers' barracks were built in and victory gardens were extensively planted throughout East Potomac Park. The first nine holes opened on July 7, 1920. A three-hole practice course opened in June 1922, and was expanded to a full nine holes some time in 1923. The final nine holes opened in late September 1924.

Work on the fieldhouse occurred alongside the golf course. Construction by the A.C. Moses Construction Co. began in June 1917. By this time, the single fieldhouse had become two fieldhouses, each slightly L-shaped with the long wing of the building on a northeast-southwest axis. The two structures were connected by a breezeway on the south side. World War I delayed their completion, and funding for the structures was scarce. Only one fieldhouse was ready by June 1919, and little additional work had been completed by August 1921. But with the golf course rapidly expanding, the single fieldhouse was quickly overwhelmed.  The first fieldhouse was finished and the second one begun and completed by December 1921.

A teahouse, a campground for tourists, and horse stables were built in the park in the 1920s. A four-mile-long pedestrian promenade was constructed around the park perimeter in 1935.

Pool

A pool was first proposed for East Potomac Park in 1927, to be located between the two fieldhouses (which would now serve as bath houses). This effort was a private one, but approved by the city.  But no work on the project was made. It wasn't until April 1935 that the federal government approved and provided funding for a pool, and even then construction did not begin until 1936. By this time, a bath house was provided for pool users, so that the fieldhouses could remain dedicated to golf course users. A major flood damaged much of the pool construction work in July 1936, and the pool finally opened on June 4, 1937.

At some point in the 1950s, 1960s, or 1970s, the eastern fieldhouse was closed to the public and turned over to the U.S Park Police for use as their District 1 Station.

The pool and bath house remained largely as constructed until 1976, when the original concrete pool was removed and replaced with a pool consisting of an aluminum shell encased in fiberglass. The bath house was also replaced at this time. The original 1936 pool deck and underground pool structures remained in place, however.

Mission 66 buildings
In 1956, the National Park Service (NPS), which owned and supervised operation of East Potomac Park, adopted a strategic plan known as Mission 66.  This ten-year strategic plan was designed to bring all NPS facilities nationwide up-to-date, and construct new facilities where needed.  Mission 66 proposed building three new structures in East Potomac Park. The first was the headquarters of the NPS' National Capital Region (NCR), constructed in the northern part of the park near the south shoreline and completed in 1963. The second was the headquarters of the United States Park Police (USPP), built adjacent to the NCR Headquarters and completed in 1964. Both buildings were designed by William M. Haussmann, an architect who was chief of the National Capital Office of Design and Construction in the National Park Service. In 1969, a one-story addition containing a cafeteria and training center was added to the north end of the NCR headquarters structure.

In 2014, the 1913 lodge and the two fieldhouses were nominated for inclusion on the National Register of Historic Places. The latter buildings were hailed as being excellent examples of the "Mission 66" style of architecture.

In 2015, the National Park Service proposed a major restructuring of all federal government operations in the Mission 66 buildings. The consolidation and renovations were needed because the NAMA headquarters and the USPP District 1 headquarters were both in a medium-risk floodplain expected to have a severe flood once in every 100 years. A portion of the USSP District 1 access road and grounds were in a floodplain expected to have a severe flood every 10 to 25 years. Additionally, planners noted that the USPP District 1 headquarters was not configured to meet heightened security needs in a post-9/11 world. NPS and USPP officials said they anticipated upgrading the HVAC and mechanical systems of the NCR headquarters, making the structure Americans with Disabilities Act compliant, and renovating the interior to create an open workspace from closed offices, which would allow far more efficient use of space and the demolition of some temporary office trailers currently on the northern corner of the complex's parking lot. A new  USPP District 1 station would be constructed on the site of the temporary trailers, allowing the fieldhouse to be returned to public use.  (There was no announcement made about the use of the 1913 lodge.) The $28 million project was being overseen by the architectural firm of Beyer Blinder Belle.

Other history
Beginning in 1971, the United States lightship Chesapeake was anchored off East Potomac Park in the Washington Channel. The ship drew 25,000 visitors annually until she was moved to Baltimore Harbor and loaned to the Baltimore Maritime Museum in 1982.

The Tidal Basin Outlet Channel Bridge, which now carried the 14th Street Bridge over the Washington Channel and East Potomac Park, was reconstructed in 1980.

Congress designated Hains Point, the southern tip of the park, as the site for a National Peace Garden in 1988. But authorization for the memorial expired without any construction occurring.

In 2003, the United States Navy enclosed  of the park between the NCR/USPP office building's parking lot and the railroad tracks, and constructed a large steel shed there. The construction bypassed normal review procedures for the use of public land and design of building in the National Capital Area, although members (but not staff) of the United States Commission of Fine Arts and the National Capital Planning Commission were later briefed about the project and sworn to secrecy. The ongoing activity, The Washington Post reported, is presumed to be related to national security. The Navy declined to address the project other than to say it was "utility assessment and upgrade", and that when the work was finished only a small utility shed will remain (with landscaping restored to its previous condition).

By 2015, East Potomac Park had fallen into disrepair. A portion of the seawall and sidewalk along the southern tip of the park was in such bad shape that the National Park Service closed the area to all pedestrian traffic in 2014.

See also
 Cuban Friendship Urn
 Hains Point
 East Potomac Park Golf Course
 West Potomac Park

Notes

Citations

Bibliography

External links

 
 
 
 
 

East
Parks in Washington, D.C.
Historic district contributing properties in Washington, D.C.
National Park Service areas in Washington, D.C.
Historic American Buildings Survey in Washington, D.C.
Historic American Landscapes Survey in Washington, D.C.
American football venues in Washington, D.C.
Baseball venues in Washington, D.C.
Rugby union stadiums in Washington, D.C.
Soccer venues in Washington, D.C.
Softball venues in Washington, D.C.
Swimming venues in Washington, D.C.
Tennis venues in Washington, D.C.
Southwest (Washington, D.C.)